Aminosalicylic acid can refer to any amino derivative of salicylic acid, such as:

 3-Aminosalicylic acid
 4-Aminosalicylic acid (para-aminosalicylic acid, PAS)
 5-Aminosalicylic acid (mesalazine)
 6-Aminosalicylic acid

Anilines
Salicylic acids